A Man About Town is a 1923 American silent film starring Stan Laurel.

Cast
 Stan Laurel as A man about town
 Katherine Grant as The girl
 James Finlayson as Humko, store detective
 Charles Stevenson as Shop assistant
 George Rowe as Cross-eyed barber
 Mark Jones as Cross-eyed barber
 Eddie Baker as Cop
 Sammy Brooks as Bit Role (uncredited)
 Sunshine Hart as Bit Role (uncredited)
 Sam Lufkin as Bit Role (uncredited)

See also
 List of American films of 1923
 Stan Laurel filmography

References

External links

1923 films
1923 short films
Silent American comedy films
American silent short films
American black-and-white films
1923 comedy films
Films directed by George Jeske
American comedy short films
1920s American films